This is a list of active baseball players who hold Canadian citizenship, who have played in Major League Baseball (MLB).

Active players

Awards and notable accomplishments
Baseball Hall of Fame
Ferguson Jenkins, 1991
Larry Walker, 2020
Most Valuable Player Award
Larry Walker, 1997 NL
Justin Morneau, 2006 AL
Joey Votto, 2010 NL
Freddie Freeman, 2020 NL

Cy Young Award
Ferguson Jenkins, Chicago Cubs 1971 NL
Éric Gagné, Los Angeles Dodgers 2003 NL

Rookie of the Year Award
Jason Bay, Pittsburgh Pirates 2004 NL

Silver Slugger Award
Larry Walker, 3 times, Montreal Expos 1992, Colorado Rockies 1997 and 1999 NL
Freddie Freeman, 3 times, 2019, 2020, 2021 NL
Justin Morneau, 2 times, 2006, 2008 AL
Jason Bay, 2009 AL
Russell Martin, 2007 NL
Vladimir Guerrero Jr., 2021 AL

Gold Glove
Larry Walker, 7 times, 1992–93, 1997–99, 2001–02 NL
Russell Martin, 2007 NL (Was also a Finalist in 2012 (AL), 2013 and 2014 (NL) and 2015 (AL) but did not win)
Joey Votto, 2011 NL (Was also a Finalist in 2012, 2017 and 2018 but did not win)
(Justin Morneau was an NL Finalist in 2014 but did not win)
Freddie Freeman, 2018 NL (Was also a Finalist in 2012 but did not win)
Tyler O'Neill, St. Louis Cardinals 2020 NL, St. Louis Cardinals 2021 NL
Vladimir Guerrero Jr., 2022 AL

Hank Aaron Award
Joey Votto, Cincinnati Reds 2010 NL

Rolaids Relief Man Award
Éric Gagné, 2003 and 2004 Los Angeles Dodgers NL
John Axford, Milwaukee Brewers 2011 NL

Batting Champion
Larry Walker, 3 times, Colorado Rockies 1998, 1999, 2001 NL
Justin Morneau, Colorado Rockies 2014 NL

Home Run Champion
Larry Walker, Colorado Rockies 1997 NL

Triples Champion
Jeff Heath, 2 times, 1938, 1941 AL

Home Run Derby Winner
Justin Morneau, Minnesota Twins 2008

Immaculate Inning Pitched (An Immaculate Inning occurs when a pitcher strikes out all three batters in only 9 pitches. 106 Immaculate Innings have been achieved in MLB History - as of Nov 20-21)

Rich Harden,  Oakland Athletics - June 8, 2008 against Los Angeles Angels - 1st Inning - Maicer Izturis, Howie Kendrick and Garret Anderson

Immaculate Inning Strike Out "Victim" (106 Immaculate Innings in MLB History - as of Nov 20-21)

Rich Butler (Mike Mussina - Baltimore Orioles in 9th inning against the Tampa Bay Rays at Tropicana Field on May 9, 1998)

Jim Adduci (Dellin Betances - New York Yankees in 8th inning against the Detroit Tigers at Yankee Stadium on August 2, 2017)

Tyler O'Neill (Josh Hader - Milwaukee Brewers in the 9th inning against the St. Louis Cardinals at Miller Park on March 30, 2019)

Pitched a 3-Pitch Inning (Only 195 Such 3-Pitch Innings (111 in the National League and 84 in the American League) have been documented (but others may have occurred in the pre-pitch-count era) in MLB History - as of Nov 20-21)

Jeff Francis  - Colorado Rockies on September 23, 2007 in the bottom of the 4th Inning against the San Diego Padres at PetCo Park. Mike Cameron (Groundout), Josh Bard (Single to Left Field) and Marcus Giles (Grounded into a Double Play)

MLB Record for "Pinch-Hit" Home Runs (as of July 3-21)

Matt Stairs - 23 Home Runs (14 in the National League and 9 in the American League) of his Career total of 265 Home Runs (8.67%).  Three more than the #2 player (Cliff Johnson).

All-Star Selection

Joey Votto, 6 times, 2010, 2011, 2012, 2013, 2017 and 2018 NL
Freddie Freeman, 6 times, 2013, 2014, 2018, 2019, 2021, and 2022 NL
Larry Walker, 5 times, 1992, 1997, 1998, 1999 and 2001 NL
Justin Morneau, 4 times, 2007, 2008, 2009 and 2010 AL
Russell Martin, 4 times, 2007 and 2008 NL, 2011 and 2015 AL
Jason Bay, 3 times, 2005, 2006 NL, 2009 AL
Éric Gagné, 3 times, 2002, 2003 and 2004 NL
Ferguson Jenkins, 3 times 1967, 1971, 1972 NL
Jeff Heath, 3 times, 1941, 1943, 1945 (game not held) AL
Ryan Dempster, 2 times, 2000 and 2008 NL
Terry Puhl, 1978 NL
Paul Quantrill, 2001 AL
Claude Raymond, 1966 NL
Jeff Zimmerman, 1999 NL
Jason Dickson, 1997 AL
Michael Saunders, 2016 AL
Mike Soroka, 2019 NL
John Hiller, 1974 AL
Jesse Crain, 2013 AL
George Selkirk, 2 times, 1936 and 1939 AL
Goody Rosen, 1945 NL
Oscar Judd, 1943 AL
Vladimir Guerrero Jr., 2 times, 2021 AL and 2022 AL
Jordan Romano, 2022 AL

World Series Winners 

Bill O'Neill - Chicago White Sox - 1906
George "Mooney" Gibson - Pittsburgh - 1909
John "Jack" Graney - Cleveland Indians - 1920
George "Twinkletoes" Selkirk - New York Yankees - 1936, 1937, 1938, 1939 and 1941
Ron Taylor - St. Louis Cardinals - 1964 and New York Mets - 1969
John Hiller - Detroit Tigers - 1968
Rob Butler - Toronto Blue Jays - 1993
Eric Gagne - Boston Red Sox - 2007
Matt Stairs - Philadelphia Phillies - 2008
R. J. (Robert Joseph) Swindle - Philadelphia Phillies - 2008
Ryan Dempster - Boston Red Sox - 2013
Freddie Freeman - Atlanta Braves - 2021

World Series Losers 

Larry McLean (John Bannerman) - New York Giants - 1913

George "Twinkletoes" Selkirk - New York Yankees - 1940

John Rutherford - New York Giants - 1952

Reggie Cleveland - Boston Red Sox - 1975 (Also was the First Canadian to be a Starting Pitcher in a World Series Game - October 16, 1975)

Larry Walker - St. Louis Cardinals - 2004

Jeff Francis - Colorado Rockies - 2007 (Was Second Canadian to start a World Series game (October 3, 2007) and was First Canadian Pitcher to win a Play-off game - an NLDS (Philadelphia Phillies)  and an NLCS (Arizona Diamondbacks)) game.

Matt Stairs - Philadelphia Phillies - 2009

John Axford - St. Louis Cardinals - 2013

Players 
This is an alphabetical list of 257 baseball players from Canada who have played in Major League Baseball since 1871.


A

Jim Adduci
Bob Addy
Andrew Albers
Bob Alexander
Wiman Andrus
Bill Atkinson
Derek Aucoin
Phillippe Aumont
John Axford

B

Ed Bahr
John Balaz
Vince Barton
Jason Bay
Érik Bédard
Reno Bertoia
Denis Boucher
Ted Bowsfield
Ryan Braun
Tom Burgess
Rich Butler
Rob Butler
Ralph Buxton

C

Paul Calvert
Jack "Happy Jack" Cameron
Bob Casey
Stubby Clapp
Nig Clarke
Jimmy Claxton
Reggie Cleveland
Jim Cockman
Chub Collins
Frank Colman
Bunk Congalton
Earl Cook
Rhéal Cormier
Barry Cort
Pete Craig
Jesse Crain
Ken Crosby
Clarence Currie
Éric Cyr

D

Tom Daly
Ray Daviault
Dave Davidson
Shorty Dee
Fred Demarais
Ryan Dempster
Scott Diamond
Jason Dickson
John Doyle
Rob Ducey
Gus Dugas
Steve Dunn

E

Bob Emslie
Joe Erautt

F

Harry Fisher
Gene Ford
Russ Ford
Dick Fowler
Jeff Francis
Freddie Freeman
Doug Frobel

G

Éric Gagné
Mike Gardiner
Alex Gardner
George Gibson
Roland Gladu
Glen Gorbous
Jack Graney
Jason Green
Steve Green
Taylor Green
Vladimir Guerrero, Jr.
Aaron Guiel

H

Vern Handrahan
Pat Hannivan
Rich Harden
Alex Hardy
Tim Harkness
Bill Harris
Tom Harrison
Blake Hawksworth
Jeff Heath
Jim Henderson
Shawn Hill
John Hiller
Paul Hodgson
Bob Hooper
Vince Horsman
Peter Hoy
John Humphries
Bill Hunter

I

Arthur Irwin
John Irwin

J

Ferguson Jenkins
Abbie Johnson
Mike Johnson
Spud Johnson
Bill Jones
Mike Jones
Oscar Judd

K

Win Kellum
Mel Kerr
Mike Kilkenny
Danny Klassen
Joe Knight
Jimmy Knowles
George Korince
Corey Koskie
George Kottaras
Joe Krakauskas
Andy Kyle

L

Pete Laforest
Ty LaForest
Fred Lake
Larry Landreth
Sam LaRocque
Ron Law
Jim Lawrence
Brett Lawrie
Charles Leblanc
Pete LePine
Chris Leroux
Dick Lines
Rick Lisi
Adam Loewen
Otto Lopez
Red Long
Pat Lyons

M

Eric Mackenzie
Ken MacKenzie
Bill Magee
Trystan Magnuson
Georges Maranda
Phil Marchildon
Russell Martin
Scott Mathieson
Matt Maysey
Ralph McCabe
Kirk McCaskill
Art McGovern
Cody McKay
Dave McKay
Jim McKeever
Larry McLean
Charlie Mead
Chris Mears
Doc Miller
Dustin Molleken
Jerrie Moore
Justin Morneau
Jon Morrison
Bill Mountjoy
Henry Mullin
Larry Murphy
Aaron Myette

N

Josh Naylor
Kevin Nicholson
Mike Nickeas
The Only Nolan

O

John O'Brien
Dan O'Connor
Greg O'Halloran
Bill O'Hara
Bill O'Neill
Fred O'Neill
Harry O'Neill
Tip O'Neill
Tyler O'Neill
Frank O'Rourke
Pete Orr
Fred Osborne
Brian Ostrosser
Frank Owens
Henry Oxley

P

Dave Pagan
James Paxton
Bill Pfann
Bill Phillips
Ron Piché
Ed Pinnance
Jim Pirie
Nick Pivetta
Gordie Pladson
Dalton Pompey
Simon Pond
Zach Pop
Terry Puhl

Q

Cal Quantrill
Paul Quantrill

R

Ryan Radmanovich
Newt Randall
Claude Raymond
Billy Reid
Scott Richmond
Jim Riley
Sherry Robertson
Chris Robinson
Jacob Robson
Jamie Romak
Jordan Romano
Goody Rosen
Ernie Ross
Phil Routcliffe
Dave Rowan
Jean-Pierre Roy
Johnny Rutherford

S

Michael Saunders
Patrick Scanlan
George Selkirk
Harvey Shank
Vince Shields
Dave Shipanoff
Joe Siddall
Steve Sinclair
Bert Sincock
Bud Sketchley
Frank Smith
Pop Smith
Cooney Snyder
Mike Soroka
Paul Spoljaric
Ed Springer
Max St. Pierre
Matt Stairs
Bob Steele
Adam Stern
Andy Stewart
Kid Summers
R. J. Swindle

T

Jameson Taillon
Oscar Taveras
Ron Taylor
Jesen Therrien
Tug Thompson
Scott Thorman
Abraham Toro
Rene Tosoni

U

John Upham

V

Gene Vadeboncoeur
Ozzie Van Brabant
Joey Votto

W

Dave Wainhouse
George Walker
Larry Walker
Pete Ward
Bill Watkins
Joe Weber
Milt Whitehead
Rowan Wick
Lefty Wilkie
Nigel Wilson
Steve Wilson
Ed Wingo
Fred Wood
George Wood
Pete Wood

Z

Rob Zastryzny
Jeff Zimmerman
Jordan Zimmerman

See also 
 List of Canadians in NASCAR
 List of Canadians in the National Basketball Association
 List of Canadians in the National Football League

References

Players Born in Canada Baseball-Reference.com

External links
 Baseball almanac

Major League baseball
Can
+